Lena is an unincorporated community in southern Jackson Township, Parke County, in the U.S. state of Indiana. A portion of Lena also extends into Clay County, just north of Carbon. This portion of Lena is referred to as Marysville.

History
Lena was platted in 1870 when the railroad was extended to that point. A post office was established at Lena in 1880, and remained in operation until it was discontinued in 1936.

Geography

References

Unincorporated communities in Indiana
Unincorporated communities in Parke County, Indiana